What Headphones? is a 1993 album by André Previn.

Reception

The album was reviewed by Richard S. Ginell at Allmusic who wrote that it was Previn's "best album since his return to jazz at the close of the 1980s, and also the most surprising and unpredictable one of his entire jazz life". Ginell highlighted the title track, which he wrote was "almost avant-garde in its erudite looniness". Ginell praised Previn's playing as possessing "greater streaks of wit and a cannier use of space than ever before".

Track listing
"What Headphones?" (André Previn) – 6:09
"You Are My All" (Myrna Summers) – 5:27
"Take the 'A' Train" (Billy Strayhorn) – 4:50
"Outside the Cafe" (A. Previn) – 3:10
"All Is Well" (Al Hobbs) – 4:42
"A Portrait of Bert Williams" (Duke Ellington) – 4:13
"Warm Valley" (Ellington, Bob Russell) – 5:30
"Holy Spirit in Me" (Jay Terrell) – 3:20
"I'm Beginning to See the Light" (Ellington, Don George, Johnny Hodges, Harry James) – 5:18
"You're Gonna Hear from Me" (A. Previn, Dory Previn) – 4:19
"You Never Gave Up on Me" (V. Michael McKay) – 4:32

Personnel
André Previn – piano, arranger, liner notes
Ray Brown – double bass
Warren Vaché – cornet
Richard Todd – French horn
Mundell Lowe – guitar
Jim Pugh – trombone
Grady Tate – drums
Earl Brown Singers

Production
Bob Abriola – art direction, director
Roy Clark, Richard Clarke – assistant engineer  
Alice Butts – digital artwork, package Ddesign  
Qwendolyn Brown – director, musical direction  
Earle Brown – director 
Phil Ramone – engineer, producer  
John Patterson – engineer
Will Friedwald, Gene Lees – liner notes
Bernie Grundman, Allen Silverman – mastering
Bryan Carrigan – mixing assistant
Don Hahn – mixing
Daniel Root – photography
Anaida Garcia – production assistant 
Jill Dell'Abate – project coordinator
Hugh Fordin – reissue producer

References

1993 albums
Albums produced by Phil Ramone
André Previn albums
Angel Records albums